Maluri is a suburb in the constituency of Cheras, Kuala Lumpur, situated near the border of the constituency of Titiwangsa. 

It is located along Cheras Road Federal Route 1 and can be accessed through Maluri station served by the LRT Ampang Line and the MRT Kajang Line. It is one of the housing areas closest to Kuala Lumpur's Golden Triangle.

Location
Maluri is located close to the boundary between Cheras and Kuala Lumpur's central business district. It is adjacent to Kampung Pandan, Pandan Jaya and Cochrane Road, and across the Kerayong River is the development of Shamelin Perkasa.

Education
Maluri houses a number of public schools, private schools and international schools, most notably Taylor's International School.

Commercial activity
Maluri is the home of JUSCO's oldest store in Malaysia, which opened on 30 October 1989. The store, like all other JUSCO stores in Malaysia, was rebranded as AEON in March 2012. Newer malls sprung up in the area in recent years, including Sunway Velocity Mall. IKEA's second store in Malaysia opened along Cochrane Road, just adjacent to Maluri.

Access

Car
Maluri is located along Cheras Road, next to its interchange with Besraya Expressway . The area can also accessed via Cochrane Road, Jalan Perkasa and the MRR2 via Pandan Jaya.

Public transportation
Maluri lends its name to the  Maluri station, served by both the LRT Ampang Line and the MRT Kajang Line. Cochrane MRT station is another MRT station located near the suburb.

Maluri is also an important rapidKL bus hub, with routes going as far as KLCC, Kajang and Titiwangsa.

See also
Cochrane Road

References

Suburbs in Kuala Lumpur